Scutopodidae is a monotypic family of molluscs in the class Aplacophora.

References

Aplacophorans
Monotypic protostome taxa